Introduction   

Pujya Shree Mota was born on 4 September 1898 & left his body on 23rd July 1976. Chunilal Asharam Bhavsar, was his childhood name. He used to live in Savli in Baroda District in Gujarat. He founded the Hari Om Ashram, also known as the Maun Mandir, near Nadiad & Surat. Chunalal Asharam Bhavsar (Pujya Shree Mota) was from a very poor family & had a very exploited childhood. He & his family used to live hand to mouth, & had a very simple living. Irrespective of his poor conditions at home, he always was aspired to keep working & studying all at once & managed his time very well. He was very sincere & loving so always used to get from nearby mentors, teachers, relatives & few people from communities.     

Understanding the purpose of life due to sufferings  

Pujya shree Mota in his young days was a very loving & helping boy, he used to go & serve a Saint near the banks of River. Mota used to serve him every day. While taking leave of the sadhu Mota bowed to him and asked his blessings. He asked me to ‘Remember and chant God’s Name at all times, think of God constantly in his heart and by this Mota will be cured of this disease which that saint assured him. As (Chunilal) Pujya Shri Mota was a logical being & thought Saint could have given him herbs from the woods. Mota had no faith or belief that I would be cured of my disease by constant Remembrance of God. This saint even told Mota that after one year a (Keshavnanji - DADAJi from Khandva) SadGuru will come to Mota and help him to evolve in his spiritual life. ‘Evolve’ and ‘Spiritual Life’ were just unintelligible words to Mota then. But at that time Pujya shree Mota had unbounded zeal for the service of my country, which was the only reality of his life then.    

An ailment like epilepsy which attacks only to Mota and taken hold of him. Later he thought this life was useless and meaningless to him. And so Mota decided and resolved in his heart of hearts to put an end to his life by jumping and resting his head in the lap of my mother Narmada River. A little beyond Garudeswar (A place in Gujarat) there is a high overhanging rock. Chunilal (Pujya Shree Mota) walked back a few steps and then ran fast and jumped over the ledge into the river. Mota remembered very clearly the touch of the fast flowing river on his feet, and the living vibrant picture comes up vividly before his mind’s eye. Hardly had the touch been felt by his feet when out of the currents of the water there rose up a strong whirlwind, and lifting his body, threw him high far on the other bank. Mota had a strange vision then. Mota's figure or the form of the vision was not of this world, but ethereal, other worldly and strange. He was miraculously saved. Then it suddenly dawned on him, ‘By His (GODS) Grace he is meant for something. God has a purpose and a plan for him in his life’. He became suddenly aware and convinced of this truth. From that hour Mota's face turned towards God.

Further reading
 
 Om, Hari, The Fragrance of a Saint: Life-incidents of a Gujarati Saint Pujya Shree Mota. India: Hari Om Ashram Publication, 1998.

External links
 Hari Om Mota Website

1898 births
1976 deaths
Advaitin philosophers
Indian Hindu spiritual teachers
People from Vadodara
Maharaja Sayajirao University of Baroda alumni
20th-century Hindu religious leaders